School District 18 was a Canadian school district in New Brunswick.

District 18 was an Anglophone district operating 32 public schools (gr. K-12) in York and Northumberland counties.

District 18 enrollment was approximately 12,500 students and 800 teachers.  District 18 was headquartered in Fredericton.

Dianne Wilkins was the superintendent of District 18 from April 18, 2011, until June 30, 2012.

In 2012, the provincial government announced a series of amalgamations of New Brunswick school districts. A new district named Anglophone West School District was created to take effect on July 1, 2012. This new district includes the schools that were formerly under the jurisdiction of School Districts 14, 17, and 18. David McTimoney, formerly Superintendent of District 17, became the Superintendent of Anglophone District West on July 1, 2012. The superintendent's office is located in Fredericton and satellite district offices are in Oromocto and Woodstock.

List of schools

High schools
 Central New Brunswick Academy
 Fredericton High School
 Harvey High School
 Leo Hayes High School
 McAdam High School
 Stanley Regional High School

Middle schools
 Bliss Carman Middle School
 Central New Brunswick Academy
 Devon Middle School
 George Street Middle School
 Nashwaaksis Middle School

Elementary schools
 Alexander Gibson Memorial School (Retired)
 Barkers Point School
 Connaught Street School
 Doaktown Primary School
 Douglas School
 Forest Hill School (Fredericton, New Brunswick)
 Garden Creek School
 Harvey Elementary School (Harvey, New Brunswick)
 Kingsclear Consolidated School
 Liverpool Street School
 McAdam Elementary School
 McAdam Avenue School
 Montgomery Street School (Fredericton, New Brunswick)
 Nashwaak Valley School
 Nashwaaksis Memorial School
 New Maryland Elementary School
 Park Street School
 Priestman Street Elementary School, K-5
 Royal Road School
 South Devon School
 Stanley Elementary School (New Brunswick)
 Upper Miramichi Elementary School

Combined elementary and middle schools
 Keswick Ridge School

Private schools
 Devon Park Christian School
 Montessori World Inc.

Other schools
 District 18 Education Centre
 Nova Learning Center

External links
 

Former school districts in New Brunswick